This is a list of United States Army Air Force - Air Force Component Commands. It covers the component commands of the numbered air forces during World War II. During that period, that numbered air forces had a status currently enjoyed by Air Force major commands.

 I Bomber Command
 I Fighter Command
 I Troop Carrier Command
 II Bomber Command
 III Air Support Command
 III Bomber Command
 III Fighter Command
 III Reconnaissance Command
 III Tactical Air Command
 IV Bomber Command
 IV Fighter Command
 V Bomber Command
 V Fighter Command
 VI Bomber Command
 VII Bomber Command
 VIII Air Support Command
 VIII Bomber Command
 VIII Fighter Command
 IX Air Defense Command
 IX Fighter Command
 IX Tactical Air Command
 IX Troop Carrier Command
 IX Air Service Command
 IX Engineer Command (airfield construction, see Advanced Landing Ground)
 XI Bomber Command
 XI Fighter Command
 XII Bomber Command
 XII Tactical Air Command
 XII Engineer Command
 XIII Bomber Command
 XIII Fighter Command
 XV Fighter Command
 XIX Tactical Air Command
 XX Bomber Command
 XXI Bomber Command
 XXII Bomber Command
 XXII Tactical Air Command
 XXVI Fighter Command
 XXXVI Fighter Command

Notes

References
 Maurer, Maurer (1983). Air Force Combat Units Of World War II. Maxwell AFB, Alabama: Office of Air Force History. .

Air Force Component Commands